Laura Calder is the author of French Food at Home. She also wrote the bestselling French Taste: Elegant, Everyday, Eating, which won the 2010 Taste Canada gold medal for Cookbook. Her latest release is Dinner Chez Moi: The Fine Art of Feeding Friends.

Calder was host of the James Beard Award-winning series French Food at Home, airing on Food Network Canada, The Cooking Channel, and other international stations. She is also a judge on Recipe to Riches, a reality series on Food Network Canada, and has been a guest judge on both Top Chef Canada and Iron Chef America.

In 2011, the Canadian government announced that Calder had received the Order of Agricultural Merit from the French government, in the standing of knight.

Personal life
Calder was born in Saint John, New Brunswick, and raised in Long Reach on Kingston Peninsula, the southern part of New Brunswick.  She left New Brunswick to attend Concordia University in Montreal, Quebec. She also attended York University in Toronto, and the London School of Economics in the U.K., after a stint as a sports reporter for a New Brunswick newspaper. Leaving London to return to Canada, Calder took a job in PR, but left that position to enroll in the Dubrulle Culinary Institute, a cooking school in Vancouver. She then honed her cooking skills at the Ecole de Cuisine La Varenne in France.

Filmography

Awards and nominations
2009: James Beard Foundation Award — Nominated for Best Television Food Show, National and Local 
2010: Taste Canada — Winner of Gold Medal for Cookbook: French Taste: Elegant Everyday Eating 
2010: James Beard Foundation Award — Winner of Best Television Show, In Studio or Fixed Location for French Food at Home 
2011: Awarded Order of Agricultural Merit

Bibliography
French Food At Home, (2003)
French Taste: Elegant Everyday Eating, HarperCollins Publishers Ltd, (2009)
Dinner Chez Moi: the Fine Art of Feeding Friends, HarperCollins Publishers Ltd (2011)
Paris Express: Simple Food from the City of Style, HarperCollins Publishers Ltd. 2014 
The Inviting Life: An Inspirational Guide to Homemaking, Hosting and Opening the Door to Happiness, Doubleday Canada (2017)

References

External links
Laura Calder's official website

Canadian expatriates in France
Canadian expatriates in England
Canadian food writers
Canadian television chefs
Knights of the Order of Agricultural Merit
Living people
Women chefs
Writers from Saint John, New Brunswick
Year of birth missing (living people)
Canadian women chefs